The 1986 Bowling Green Falcons football team was an American football team that represented Bowling Green University in the Mid-American Conference (MAC) during the 1986 NCAA Division I-A football season. In their first season under head coach Moe Ankney, the Falcons compiled a 5–6 record (5–3 against MAC opponents), finished in a tie for second place in the MAC, and were outscored by all opponents by a combined total of 222 to 148.

The team's statistical leaders included Rich Dackin with 1,197 passing yards, Jeff Davis with 782 rushing yards, and Ronald Heard with 359 receiving yards.

Schedule

References

Bowling Green
Bowling Green Falcons football seasons
Bowling Green Falcons football